The 2006 Hampton Pirates football team represented Hampton University as a member of the Mid-Eastern Athletic Conference (MEAC) in the 2006 NCAA Division I FCS football season. They were led by fifteenth-year head coach Joe Taylor and played their home games at Armstrong Stadium. They finished the season with a 10–2 overall record, won the MEAC championship with a 7–1 record in conference play and earned a berth to the first round of the NCAA Division I playoffs, where they were defeated by New Hampshire.

Hampton won the black college football national championship as awarded by three selectors, with North Carolina Central chosen by five other selectors.

Schedule

References

Hampton
Hampton Pirates football seasons
Black college football national champions
Mid-Eastern Athletic Conference football champion seasons
Hampton Pirates football